Epratuzumab (planned trade name LymphoCide) is a humanized monoclonal antibody.  Potential uses may be found in oncology and in treatment of inflammatory autoimmune disorders, such as systemic lupus erythematosus (SLE).

Clinical trials
A clinical trial for relapsed adult acute lymphoblastic leukemia (ALL) has reported initial results.

Results have been published for a phase II trial in untreated follicular lymphoma.

Early results from a phase II trial for Diffuse large B-cell lymphoma (DLBCL) were encouraging.

The manufacturers in August 2009 announced success in early trials against SLE, and started two Phase III clinical trials.
July 2015 : Both phase III trials (EMBODY1/2) for SLE failed to meet their primary endpoint.

Mechanism of action
Epratuzumab binds to the glycoprotein CD22 of mature and malignant B-cells.

Elevated CD22 and other B-cell receptor (BCR) proteins are associated with SLE. "Epratuzumab's mechanism of action transfers these BCR proteins to helper cells called effector cells which reduces B-cell destruction and epratuzumab's impact on the body's immune system" via a process called trogocytosis. Other SLE therapies destroy B-cells which compromises the immune system.

References 

Monoclonal antibodies for tumors